Grace Kennedy may refer to:
 GraceKennedy, Jamaican conglomerate 
 Grace Kennedy (writer) (1782–1825), Scottish writer
 Grace Kennedy (singer), former BBC British singer and television presenter, now luxury wedding and event designer
 Poto and Cabengo (Grace and Virginia Kennedy), American identical twins